Łukasz Kubot and Marcelo Melo were the defending champions and successfully defended their title, defeating Alexander and Mischa Zverev in the final, 7–6(7–1), 6–4 in a repeat of the previous year's final.

Seeds

Draw

Draw

Qualifying

Seeds

Qualifiers
  Jonathan Erlich /  Nicholas Monroe

Qualifying draw

References

 Main draw
 Qualifying draw

2018 Gerry Weber Open